El Cubo de Tierra del Vino is a municipality located in the province of Zamora, Castile and León, Spain. According to the 2009 census (INE), the municipality has a population of 429 inhabitants.

It was probably the city named Sabaria in some chronicles of the Roman age.

References

Municipalities of the Province of Zamora